Laughing may refer to:

 Laughter, an expression or sound
 Laughing (character), a character in the Hong Kong TV series E.U.
Laughing (EP), an EP by Anne McCue
 "Laughing" (The Guess Who song), a single by Canadian rock band The Guess Who from their 1969 album Canned Wheat
 "Laughing" (David Crosby song), a song by American guitarist and singer David Crosby on his 1971 solo album If I Could Only Remember My Name
"Laughing", a song by The Byrds from their 1973 album Byrds
 "Laughing", a song by R.E.M. from their 1983 album Murmur
 "Laughing Song", a poem by William Blake
 "The Laughing Song", a song by George Washington Johnson, the first song by an African American to top the chart in 1891
 "The Laughing Song", Adele's aria "Mein Herr Marquis" from Johann Strauss the Younger's 1874 operetta Die Fledermaus
 "Laughing Song", or "L'éclat de rire", from the opera Manon Lescaut by Daniel Auber
 Laughing dove, a small pigeon that is a resident breeder in Sub-Saharan Africa

See also
 Laugh (disambiguation)